Masters M80 discus world record progression is the progression of world record improvements of the discus M80 division of Masters athletics.  Records must be set in properly conducted, official competitions under the standing IAAF rules unless modified by World Masters Athletics.

The M80 division consists of male athletes who have reached the age of 80 but have not yet reached the age of 85, so exactly from their 80th birthday to the day before their 85th birthday. The M80 division throws a 1 kg implement.

Key

References

Masters Athletics Discus list
All Time Athletics

Masters athletics world record progressions
Discus